Campnosperma auriculatum is a rainforest tree of the family Anacardiaceae native to the East Indies and Southeast Asia. The flowers are yellowish, in small panicles, forming reddish berries upon pollination.

Pests
The rubber termite Coptotermes curvignathus is a minor pest of C. auriculatum.

References

auriculatum
Flora of Southeast Asia